Shadowdance may refer to:

 Shadowdance (Shadowfax album), 1983
 Shadowdance (Chris White album), 1991
 Shadowdance (novel), a 1991 novel by Robin Wayne Bailey